The following lists all rail stations of Light Rail Transit (LRT) systems in Singapore. As the LRT systems are intra-town loop and/or shuttle services, train routes may not run in ascending/descending sequence of the stations' alpha-numeric codes. , there are 41 LRT stations in operation.

Abbreviation for LRT stations are listed as transaction histories viewed via General Ticketing Machines display trip details using abbreviated station names.

LRT stations 
Legend

See also
 List of Singapore MRT stations

Notes

References

External links
 Train System Map

Light Rail Transit (Singapore)
Singapore LRT
LRT Stations